San Carlo alle Mortelle is a Baroque style, Roman Catholic church in central Naples, Italy.

History
The church was erected in 1616 under design of Giovanni Ambrogio Mazenta. Most of the work was completed within the 17th century, while the façade, designed by Enrico Pini, was finished only in the mid- and late-18th century. The latter has two orders, with capitals featuring floral motifs; at the sides of the main portal are statues of St Liborius and the Blessed Alessandro Sauli (from the Barnabite Order), while in a central niche is the statue of St Charles Borromeo, the church's titular.

The interior is on the Latin cross plan, with three side chapels. In a building at the right of the church are the remains of the Baroque cloister and, in another building now housing a school, remains of Francesco Solimena's frescoes, once part of the college annexed to the church.

Sources

Roman Catholic churches in Naples
Baroque architecture in Naples
Roman Catholic churches completed in 1616
17th-century Roman Catholic church buildings in Italy
1616 establishments in Italy